MTV Roadies X2 is the 12th season of Indian reality show MTV Roadies.

Destination

Roadies' selection

Contestants
There are twenty two contestants selected from 4 cities.

Voting History

 Ranvijay Gang
 Karan Gang
 Vijender Gang
 Eisha Gang

 Indicates the contestant was immune that week.
 Indicates the contestant was in the danger that week.
 Indicates the contestant was eliminated that week.
 The contestant quit the competition
 Indicates the contestant wild card entry in the competition.
 Indicates the contestant won the task and was saved from elimination.
 Indicates the contestant was eliminated outside vote out that week.
 Indicates the contestant is the runner up.
 Indicates the contestant won the competition.

References

External links 
 

MTV Roadies
2015 Indian television seasons